Character Codex is a supplement for fantasy role-playing games published by Judges Guild in 1979.

Contents
Character Codex is a players' aid, a book of character record sheets, each with an illustration portraying a character of the appropriate class.  It also includes an equipment price list.

Publication history
Character Codex features art by Jennell Jaquays, and was published by Judges Guild in 1979 as a 96-page book.

TSR extended Judges Guild's license to include Advanced Dungeons & Dragons in 1978, which allowed Judges Guild to produce many more products in that line, beginning with the Character Codex (1979).

Reception

Notes

References

Character sheets
Judges Guild fantasy role-playing game supplements
Role-playing game supplements introduced in 1979